Sorpresa Rock is an exposed rock lying southwest of Cavalier Rock, off the south end of Adelaide Island. The name appears on a Chilean government chart of 1947. Sorpresa is a Spanish word meaning surprise.

Rock formations of Adelaide Island